Walker: Independence is an American western television series developed by Seamus Kevin Fahey and Anna Fricke for The CW. It is a prequel to the television series Walker, which also airs on The CW. The series stars Katherine McNamara in the lead role, along with Matt Barr as Hoyt Rawlins, and Katie Findlay as Kate, with Greg Hovanessian, Philemon Chambers, Justin Johnson Cortez, Lawrence Kao, and Gabriela Quezada also starring. The series was ordered in May 2022 for a fall premiere, paired with its parent series in a Thursday time slot on October 6, 2022.

Premise 
Set in the late 1800s, this origin story follows Abby Walker, an affluent Bostonian whose husband is murdered before her eyes while on their journey out West, as she crosses paths with Hoyt Rawlins, a lovable rogue in search of purpose. Abby and Hoyt's journey takes them to Independence, Texas, a small town with a big future.

Cast

Main 
 Katherine McNamara as Abby Walker
 Matt Barr as Hoyt Rawlins
 Katie Findlay as Kate Carver
 Greg Hovanessian as Sheriff Tom Davidson
 Philemon Chambers as Deputy Augustus
 Justin Johnson Cortez as Calian
 Lawrence Kao as Kai
 Gabriela Quezada as Lucia Reyes

Recurring 
 Mark Sheppard as Nathaniel Hagan 
 Nestor Serrano as Francis Reyes
 Santiago Segura as Luis Reyes
 Norman Patrick Brown as Chief Taza
 Rachel Michaela as Ruby
 Timothy Granaderos as Shane Davidson

Guests 
 Brandon Sklenar as Liam Collins
 Valerie Cruz as Teresa Davidson
 Cate Jones as Molly Sullivan
 Sarah Minnich as Martha Sullivan
 Jonathan Medina as Otis Clay
 Stella Baker as Charlotte McKenzie
 Julie Zahn as Lily

Production

Development 
In December 2021, it was reported that a prequel series titled, Walker: Independence, is in development with Jared Padalecki as executive producer and Anna Fricke as showrunner. The CW was pleased with the pilot episode and gave a full series order in May 2022 for a fall premiere, pairing it with its parent series in a Thursday time slot. Fricke developed the story with Seamus Fahey, who wrote the pilot teleplay.

Casting 
In February 2022, Justin Johnson Cortez was cast as a series regular, and Matt Barr joined the cast as Hoyt Rawlins. In March 2022, it was announced that Katherine McNamara had been cast in the lead role of Abby Walker, the ancestor of Padalecki's Cordell Walker. In June 2022, Gabriela Quezada was cast as a series regular.

Filming 

The pilot for the series was filmed in Santa Fe, New Mexico in early 2022. Filming for the remainder of the season began in and around Santa Fe on July 18, 2022.

Episodes

Broadcast
Walker: Independence premiered on October 6, 2022, on The CW and aired its season finale on March 2, 2023.

Reception

Critical response
On Rotten Tomatoes, the series holds an approval rating of 71% based on 7 critic reviews, with an average rating of 7/10. Metacritic, which uses a weighted average, assigned a score of 63 out of 100 based on 7 critics, indicating "generally favorable reviews".

Ratings

References

External links 
 
 

2020s American crime drama television series
2020s Western (genre) television series
2022 American television series debuts
American action television series
American prequel television series
English-language television shows
The CW original programming
Television shows set in Texas
Television shows filmed in New Mexico
Television series set in the 1800s
Television series by CBS Studios